Fu Hsiao-han (born September 14, 1985) is a Taiwanese former swimmer, who specialized in backstroke events. Fu qualified for the women's 100 m backstroke at the 2004 Summer Olympics in Athens, by achieving a FINA B-standard of 1:05.43 from the National University Games in Taipei. She challenged seven other swimmers in heat two, including 14-year-olds Anastassiya Prilepa of Kazakhstan and Olga Gnedovskaya of Uzbekistan. She raced to sixth place by a 2.25-second margin behind winner Kiera Aitken of Bermuda in 1:06.62. Fu failed to advance into the semifinals, as she placed thirty-seventh overall in the preliminaries.

References

1985 births
Living people
Taiwanese female backstroke swimmers
Olympic swimmers of Taiwan
Swimmers at the 2004 Summer Olympics
Sportspeople from Taipei